The Adventures of Fra Diavolo is a 1942 Italian adventure film directed by Luigi Zampa and starring Enzo Fiermonte.

Cast
 Enzo Fiermonte - Michele Pezza detto "Fra' Diavolo"
 Elsa De Giorgi - Fortunata Consiglio
 Laura Nucci - Gabriella Del Prà
 Cesare Bettarini - Carlo Consiglio
 Agostino Salvietti - Ciccio La Rosa, il capo della polizia
 Carlo Romano - Tiburzio
 Loris Gizzi - Il prefetto
 Marcello Giorda - Il generale
 Renato Chiantoni - Sputafuoco

See also
 Donne e briganti (1950)

External links

1942 films
1942 adventure films
Italian adventure films
1940s Italian-language films
Italian black-and-white films
Films directed by Luigi Zampa
Napoleonic Wars films
Films set in Italy
Films set in the 1800s
Cultural depictions of Fra Diavolo
1940s Italian films